The Qu’Appelle Valley Hockey League is a C-level senior ice hockey and junior ice hockey league in the greater Regina area of Saskatchewan, Canada. It is sanctioned by Hockey Saskatchewan and Hockey Canada.

Senior history 
Formed in 1960, QVHL Senior teams have won Saskatchewan Provincial titles on several occasions. Among them:

The Balcarres Broncs were the first to bring home a title as Provincial 'C' champions in 1974.
The Grenfell Spitfires were Provincial 'B' champions in 1982.
The Milestone Flyers were 'C' winners in 1985 and 2003. The Flyers also captured the 'D' title in 1998.
The Standing Buffalo Bulls were 'A' winners in 2000.
The Balgonie Bisons won the Provincial 'A' championship in 2011 and repeated the feat in 2018.

Junior history 
Formed in 2015 after the folding of the Regina Junior C Hockey League (1996–2015) three former member teams (Balcarres Broncos, Lumsden Jaxx, Regina River Rats) joined the QVHL along with the White Butte Eagles. RJCHL hosted the annual Brewers Cup, the Junior C championship of Western Canada, from 1992–2014.

In March 2017 Bredenbury Tundra joined QVJHL for the 2017-18 season. The Tundra were confirmed as new expansion teams in April along with the Cupar Canucks, Wolseley Mustangs and Yellow Grass Wheat Kings.

The QVJHL announced two expansion teams (Emerald Park Wizards and Southerly Marlins) for the 2018–19 season. Cupar Canucks folded after one season, winning just three games. Bredenbury Tundra relocated to Esterhazy, but ceased operations on December 16 after nine games.

Two new teams joined the circuit for 2020–2021 with the addition of Ochapowace Thunder and Regina Shamrocks.

Teams

Former/inactive Sr. teams
 Gordon’s Golden Hawks (2004–2012)
Indian Head Chiefs (2000–2019)
 Kelliher Komets (2008–2010)
 Monmartre-Glenavon Rivals (2004–2009)
 Ogema Colts (2008–2011)
Pilot Butte Broncos (2004–2005)
 Radville Nationals (2012–2017)
 Rouleau Ramblers (2000–2010)
 Standing Buffalo Bulls (2000–2001)
Whitewood Orioles (2006–2018)
Windthorst Pirates (2000–2001)
Wolseley Winterhawks (2000–2005)

Former/inactive Jr. teams
 Balcarres Broncs (????–2017)
 Bredenbury Tundra (2017–2018)
 Cupar Canucks (2017–2018)
 Indian Head Chiefs (2006–12; 2016–2018)
 Moose Jaw Canucks (2006–2015)
 Pilot Butte Storm (????–2006) - joined Prairie Junior Hockey League
 Regina Brewers (1997–2015)
 Regina Bulldogs
 Regina Hurricanes
 Regina Mustangs
 Southey Marlins (1997–2015) 
 White Butte Eagles (2015–2018)

List of champions

Senior champions

Junior C champions

See also
List of ice hockey leagues
Sport in Saskatchewan#Team sports

References

External links
Qu’Appelle Valley Hockey League 
Hockey Regina Junior C Hockey League

Ice hockey leagues in Saskatchewan
C
Hockey Saskatchewan
Senior ice hockey